The Minden Riverkings were a Junior ice hockey team based in of Minden, Ontario, Canada.  They played in the Greater Metro Junior 'A' Hockey League.

History
In April 2008, it was announced that Minden had been chosen as a 2008-09 season expansion team within the Greater Metro Junior A Hockey League.  This marks the first time the region has received a team since nearby Haliburton had one in the 1970s.

Minden played their first ever game on September 13, 2008 against the South Muskoka Shield in Gravenhurst.  Despite the Riverkings leading most of the game, the Shield crept back in late to tie the game and won it in a five-man shootout 1-0 to win the game 6-5.

On September 20, 2008, the Riverkings recorded their first ever victory by defeating the Ville-Marie Dragons 6-3 at a showcase weekend in Thornhill, Ontario.

On November 11, 2009, the GMHL announced that the Minden Riverkings had ceased operations.

Season-by-Season Standings

Playoffs
2009 Lost division quarter-final
Elliot Lake Bobcats defeated Minden Riverkings 3-games-to-none in division quarter-final

External links
Minden Riverkings

Ice hockey teams in Ontario